Lohta is a census town in Varanasi district in the Indian state of Uttar Pradesh.

Demographics

 India census, Lohta had a population of 19,695. Males constitute 53% of the population and females 47%. Lohta has an average literacy rate of 50%, lower than the national average of 59.5%: male literacy is 55%, and female literacy is 45%. In Lohta, 22% of the population is under 6 years of age.
Since 1930 to present lohta is the largest producer of banarasi sarees.

References

Census towns in Varanasi district
Cities and towns in Varanasi district